Elections to Trafford Council were held on 4 May 2007. One third of the council was up for election, with each successful candidate to serve a four-year term of office, expiring in 2011. The Conservative Party retained overall control of the council.

After the election, the composition of the council was as follows:

Summary

Ward results

References
Official Trafford Council Election page

2007 English local elections
2007
2000s in Greater Manchester